The 2009–10 A-League National Youth League season was the second season of the Australian A-League National Youth League soccer competition. Like the previous season, the season ran alongside the 2009–10 A-League season.

Teams

League table

Results
The 2009–10 A-League National Youth League season was played over 27 rounds, followed by a finals series.

Finals series

Semi-finals

Grand Final

Season statistics

Scoring
First goal of the season: 78 minutes – Francesco Monterosso for Adelaide United Youth against Central Coast Mariners Youth (11 September 2009)
Fastest goal in a match: 1 minute – Mario Simic for Newcastle Jets Youth against Sydney FC Youth (29 November 2009) & Ben Wearing for Gold Coast United Youth against Central Coast Mariners Youth (13 March 2010)
Goal scored at the latest point in a match: 90+5 minutes – Tim Smits for Brisbane Roar Youth against Sydney FC Youth (31 January 2010)
First own goal of the season: Steve Lewis Hesketh (Brisbane Roar Youth) for Perth Glory Youth, 9 minutes (18 September 2009)
First hat-trick of the season: Nik Mrdja (Central Coast Mariners Youth) against Newcastle Jets Youth (23 October 2009)

Top scorers

Table-related statistics

Overall
Most wins – Perth Glory Youth (13)
Fewest wins – Australian Institute of Sport (3)
Most losses – Australian Institute of Sport (16)
Fewest losses – Central Coast Mariners Youth & Adelaide United Youth (4)
Most goals scored – Gold Coast United Youth (54)
Fewest goals scored – Australian Institute of Sport (32)
Most goals conceded – Brisbane Roar Youth (58)
Fewest goals conceded – Sydney Youth (33)
Best goal difference – Gold Coast United Youth (+10)
Worst goal difference – Australian Institute of Sport (−25)

Awards
 Champions: Gold Coast United
 Minor Premiers: Central Coast Mariners
 Player of the Year: Panni Nikas, Central Coast Mariners
 Golden Boot: Chris Harrold (16 goals), Gold Coast United, (Francesco Monterosso, (17 goals), Was top scorer but ineligible due to being an A League contracted player)
 Fair Play Award: Brisbane Roar

Notes

References

External links
Australien National Youth League 2009/2010 at weltfussball.de 

Youth
A-League National Youth League seasons